The Illinois Central Electric Railway (ICE) was an interurban line in Fulton County in western Illinois, west of Peoria.

The company was founded on October 9, 1903. The line ran from Lewistown north to Farmington with a branch from Norris to Fairview. The line opened as follows:

1909 Canton–Brereton–Norris
1910 Norris–Fairview
1911 Norris–Gilchrist–Maplewood–Farmington
1912 Lewistown–Bryant–St. David–Dunfermline–Canton

The railroad lost the competition to the automobile and was abandoned on July 25, 1928.

References 

Interurban railways in Illinois
Defunct Illinois railroads
Railway companies established in 1903
Railway companies disestablished in 1928
Electric railways in Illinois